George M. Brink (March 19, 1848 – June 6, 1905) was an American politician from Kingston, New York.

Life 
Brink was born in Kingston, New York on March 19, 1848. He was the son of Adam Brink.

In 1863, during the American Civil War, Brink enlisted in the 80th New York Volunteer Infantry Regiment as a musician. After the War, he returned to Kingston and became a cigar maker. In 1875, he opened his own store and became a tobacco and cigar dealer.

In 1890, Brink was elected to the New York State Assembly as a Republican, representing Ulster County, 1st District. He served in the Assembly in 1891 and 1892.

In 1894 and 1895, Brink was an excise commissioner of Kingston and alms commissioner for the Ninth Ward. In 1898 and 1899, he was supervisor for the Third department of Kingston. In 1898, he was appointed postmaster by President McKinley. He was in the National Guard for 14 years, serving as a lieutenant.

Brink married Ida E. Houghtaling in 1872. They had four daughters, Grace, Edna T., Mary M. V., and Ida T. He was a freemason, a Knight of Pythias, a member of the Independent Order of Odd Fellows, and commander of the Pratt Post, the Grand Army of the Republic. He was connected with the Kingston Fire Department since 1866.

Brink hung himself in his barn on June 6, 1905. He was buried in Wiltwyck Cemetery.

References

External links 

 The Political Graveyard
 George M. Brink at Find a Grave

1848 births
1905 suicides
Suicides by hanging in New York (state)
Politicians from Kingston, New York
People of New York (state) in the American Civil War
Union Army soldiers
Republican Party members of the New York State Assembly
19th-century American politicians
County legislators in New York (state)
New York (state) postmasters
New York National Guard personnel
American Freemasons
Grand Army of the Republic officials
American firefighters
Burials in New York (state)
1905 deaths